Thomas Kimball Code (April 13, 1873 – January 28, 1956) was an American college football player at Stanford University who also was a football coach at Oregon State University, then known as State Agricultural College.

Career
Code grew up in San Francisco, California where he attended Lowell High School. He went on to play college football at Stanford where he was the quarterback in the first Big Game against Cal.

In 1896, Code became the fourth head coach of Oregon State in the program's first four seasons. He served as the head coach for just one season, in which the team had a record of 1–2.

Head coaching record

References

External links
 

1873 births
1956 deaths
19th-century players of American football
American football quarterbacks
Oregon State Beavers football coaches
Stanford Cardinal football players
Players of American football from San Francisco